The Gering Courier Building is a historic building in Gering, Nebraska. It was built in 1915 as the third headquarters of the Gering Courier, whose founding editor, Asa Wood, served as a member of the Nebraska Senate. He was followed by his son, Warren C. Wood, who served in World War II. The building was designed in the Classical Revival style, "with symmetrical pedimented entrances flanked by pilasters and a parapeted roofline with a large classical cornice." It has been listed on the National Register of Historic Places since October 15, 2004.

References

	
National Register of Historic Places in Scotts Bluff County, Nebraska
Neoclassical architecture in Nebraska
Buildings and structures completed in 1915